Coleophora koshmella is a moth of the family Coleophoridae.

References

koshmella
Moths described in 1989